Mayapa is an urban barangay, located to the east of Sirang Lupa and southeast of Canlubang in Calamba, Laguna, Philippines. It is next to the Mayapa-Canlubang exit (Exit 47) of the South Luzon Expressway. As of the 2020 census, Mayapa had a population of 28,302.

Camp Vicente Lim

Camp Vicente Lim is Located along National Highway Mayapa Road, and also the Headquarters of PRO CALABARZON Headquarters (Region IV-A), it's also known as Calamba Airstrip or Calamba Airfield since 1922. There are primary and secondary school building inside the camp. Camp Vicente Lim Elementary School also known as Post Elementary School, and Camp Vicente Lim National High School. There's also residential area known as Campo by the locals or Bargy., Camp Vicente Lim. The means of transportation inside the Camp premises or inside Brgy., Camp Vicente Lim is by pedicab. The Regional Headquarters also the main Headquarters of Bureau of Fire also inside the Camp Vicente Lim. The National Forensic Training Institute, Bureau of Jail Management Penology, Police National Training Institute also found inside Camp Vicente Lim. There is one multi-purpose gymnasium inside the camp. Wearing sando, shorts and slippers while entering the camp is prohibited. Brgy., Camp Vicente Lim is divided into six zone, purok 1, purok 2, purok 3, purok 4, purok 5 and purok 6. Some of the landmark near Camp Vicente Lim is the Iglesia Ni Cristo house of Worship, Imall grocery and Department store. Brgy., Campo has its own covered basketball court located at purok 4 and the Veterans Hall found in purok 1.

Geography
Neighboring Barangays:
West-Canlubang, Sirang Lupa, Majada Out
East- Paciano
South- Palo Alto, Barandal, Batino
North- Canlubang

Elected Government Officials
Elected Mayapa Officers for the term of 2013 - 2016
Punong Barangay :	Taniola, Flaviano Dela Cruz
Barangay Kagawad <:>	Fabros, Alex Franco
Barangay Kagawad <:>	Perez, Lorenzo Jr. Elviña
Barangay Kagawad <:>	Bautista, Juan Carlo Rigonan
Barangay Kagawad <:>	Magampon, Jaime Villa
Barangay Kagawad <:>	Jordan, Jerusalem Aquino
Barangay Kagawad <:>	Hernandez, Rico Laurel
Barangay Kagawad <:>	Balog, Hiedi Cortez
Elected Mayapa Officers for the term of 2010 - 2013
Laguna, City Of Calamba, Mayapa, Barangay Captain, Zenaida T. Magnaye
Laguna, City Of Calamba, Mayapa, Kagawad 1, Bernardo P. Cadapan
Laguna, City Of Calamba, Mayapa, Kagawad 2, Raymond M. Perez
Laguna, City Of Calamba, Mayapa, Kagawad 3, Jaime V. Magampon
Laguna, City Of Calamba, Mayapa, Kagawad 4, Alex F. Fabros
Laguna, City Of Calamba, Mayapa, Kagawad 5, Santos L. Atienza
Laguna, City Of Calamba, Mayapa, Kagawad 6, Eddie DC. Aala
Laguna, City Of Calamba, Mayapa, Kagawad 7, Hiedi T. Cortez
Laguna, City Of Calamba, Mayapa, SK Chairman, Paolo M. Miranda

References

External links
Official Website of the Provincial Government of Laguna

Barangays of Calamba, Laguna